The "Old World" is a term for Afro-Eurasia that originated in Europe , after Europeans became aware of the existence of the Americas. It is used to contrast the continents of Africa, Europe, and Asia, which were previously thought of by their inhabitants as comprising the entire world, with the "New World", a term for the newly encountered lands of the Western Hemisphere, particularly the Americas.

Etymology
In the context of archaeology and world history, the term "Old World" includes those parts of the world which were in (indirect) cultural contact from the Bronze Age onwards, resulting in the parallel development of the early civilizations, mostly in the temperate zone between roughly the 45th and 25th parallels north, in the area of the Mediterranean, including North Africa. It also included Mesopotamia, the Persian plateau, the Indian subcontinent, China, and parts of Sub-Saharan Africa.

These regions were connected via the Silk Road trade route, and they have a pronounced Iron Age period following the Bronze Age. In cultural terms, the Iron Age was accompanied by the so-called Axial Age, referring to cultural, philosophical and religious developments eventually leading to the emergence of the historical Western (Hellenism, "classical"), Near Eastern (Zoroastrian and Abrahamic) and Far Eastern (Hinduism, Buddhism, Jainism, Sikhism, Confucianism, Taoism) cultural spheres.

Other names
The mainland of Afro-Eurasia (excluding islands or island groups such as the British Isles, Japan, Sri Lanka, Madagascar and the Malay Archipelago) has been referred to as the World Island. The term may have been coined by Sir Halford John Mackinder in The Geographical Pivot of History.

See also 

 New World
 Eurocentrism
 Afro-Eurasia

References
 

16th-century neologisms
Afro-Eurasia
Africa
Eurasia
Asia
Europe
Cultural regions
Geographical regions
Human geography
European culture
African culture
Asian culture
European colonisation in Africa
European colonisation in Asia
Country classifications
Cultural history
Age of Discovery
Cultural history of Europe